Elstree Calling is a 1930 British comedy musical film directed by Adrian Brunel and Alfred Hitchcock at Elstree Studios.

Synopsis
The film, referred to as "A Cine-Radio Revue" in its original publicity, is a lavish musical film revue and was Britain's answer to the Hollywood revues which had been produced by the major studios in the United States, such as Paramount on Parade (1930) and The Hollywood Revue of 1929. The revue has a slim plot about its being a television broadcast. The film consists of 19 comedy and music vignettes linked by running jokes of an aspiring Shakespearean actor and technical problems with a viewer's TV set.

Production background
Among Hitchcock's contributions was the comic linking segments about a man trying to "tune in" the revue on his television set, but always failing to get the picture for long because of his needless tinkering. In the UK, John Logie Baird's work in mechanical television in the 1920s made television a topical subject at the time. The film's ensemble numbers were staged by André Charlot, Paul Murray and Jack Hulbert.

Imitating the lavish use of Technicolor by Hollywood studios at that time, four sequences in the film were coloured by the Pathécolor process, which used stencils to tint selected areas of the black and white prints.

In their book Film's musical moment, Ian Conrich and Estella Tincknell write:
"The British equivalent of Hollywood's all-star revues was Elstree Calling (1930), produced by British International Pictures (BIP), which consisted mainly of musical and comedy items from stage shows of the day introduced by compère Tommy Handley. Lacking the lavish production values and visual spectacle of its Hollywood equivalents, Elstree Calling is now something of a curio item interesting chiefly for two reasons: Alfred Hitchcock (then contracted to BIP) was... employed on the production; and the film is quite possibly the first ever to refer directly to television (the linking narrative concerns a television broadcast of the revue, some six years before the BBC began regular television transmissions)."

Cast
In credits order:
 Will Fyffe
 Cicely Courtneidge
 Jack Hulbert
 Tommy Handley
 Lily Morris
 Helen Burnell
 The Berkoffs
 Bobbie Comber
 Lawrence Green
 Ivor McLaren
 Anna May Wong
 Jameson Thomas
 John Longden
 Donald Calthrop
 Gordon Harker
 Hannah Jones
 Teddy Brown
 Chocolate Kiddies trio, The Three Eddies: Shakey (Clarence) Beasley, Chick (Layburn) Horsey and Tiny (Earle) Ray
 The Balalaika Choral Orchestra
Supported by:
 The Aldelphi Girls
 The Charlot Girls
Also with:
 Gordon Begg as Shakespeare
 Nathan Shacknovsky
 John Stuart

Copyright and home video status
Like Hitchcock's other British films, all of which are copyrighted worldwide, Elstree Calling has been heavily bootlegged on home video. As of early 2019, the officially licensed, preserved version has only appeared on DVD from Network Distributing in the UK.

See also
List of early color feature films

References

External links
 
 Alfred Hitchcock Collectors’ Guide: Elstree Calling at Brenton Film

1930 films
1930s color films
Films directed by Alfred Hitchcock
Films directed by Jack Hulbert
British black-and-white films
British musical comedy films
Films about television
Films shot at British International Pictures Studios
1930s English-language films
1930 musical comedy films
Films shot in Hertfordshire
1930s British films